Magyaregregy is a village in Baranya county, Hungary.

Sightseeing 

The local tourist attraction Castle Máré is situated on the top of the hill next to Magyaregregy. There is a well marked path to the castle, from the municipal swimming pool just to the South of the village.

External links 
 Street map 

Populated places in Baranya County